Star Commandos is a 1980 board game published by Heritage Models.

Gameplay
Star Commandos is a game that comes as a set of 25mm lead miniatures including paints and rules.

Reception
Tony Watson reviewed Star Commandos in The Space Gamer No. 33. Watson commented that "While the concept behind Star Commandos was good one, I can't recommend it to most gamers because of its high price."

References

Board games introduced in 1980
Heritage Models games